Penance is the religious notion of repentance.

Penance may also refer to:
Penance (2009 film), an American horror film
Penance (2018 film), an Irish historical drama film
Penance (TV series), a 2012 Japanese miniseries
Penance (comics), several comic characters:
Robbie Baldwin
Penance (X-Men)
Penance (band), US doom metal band
Penance, a superboss in Final Fantasy X
"Penance" (Sanctuary), an episode of Sanctuary
Penance Pass, a mountain pass in Victoria Land, Antarctica
 "Penance" (Arrow), an episode of Arrow

See also
Arjuna's Penance, an Indian monolith